Blue Panorama Airlines S.p.A. was an Italian airline headquartered in Fiumicino operating scheduled and charter flights mostly to domestic and international leisure destinations. As of late 2021, the airline was in the process to change its brand name to Luke Air also retiring their former Blu-express brand used for domestic and short-haul destinations. Additional business charter flights used to be operated under the name Executive Blue. As of late October 2021, it suspended all operations until further notice and was subsequently liquidated in late 2022.

History

Blue Panorama Airlines
Blue Panorama is a private Italian airline operating intercontinental, international, and national charter and scheduled flights. It was founded in Rome in 1998 by Franco Pecci, and has been an IATA member since 2002 (IATA code BV). Since 2005, Blue Panorama Airlines' Boeing 737 fleet has operated national and international flights for the Blu-Express low-cost division.

In 2012, Alitalia declared interest in a merger with Blue Panorama, as well as with Wind Jet, another Italian airline, but decided not to proceed with the acquisitions. In October 2012, Blue Panorama entered bankruptcy protection. This license gave the airline the ability to restructure itself. On 25 November 2013, Blu-express started flights from Italy to Tirana International Airport Nënë Tereza after Belle Air ceased operations there.

In January 2014, Blue Panorama Airlines requested to be admitted to extraordinary administration procedure and the abandonment of the composition procedure in continuity. The management of the airline is left to the company's founder. Blue Panorama confirmed that company business and flights are fully operational.

In 2018 the airline came under fire as it has been the policy of Blue Panorama Airlines to charge significant fees to passengers for minor name changes.

Luke Air
In October 2019, the airline announced it would be changing its name to Luke Air by the end of 2019, revealing a new yellow-blue livery on an Airbus A330-200 which was then due to be delivered. On 7 March 2020, the first A330-200 was delivered. However, the rebranding had yet to take place. In late 2020, Blue Panorama retired their last Boeing 767-300ER. In January 2021, it was announced that the rebrand will go ahead. As of September 2021, the airline's official website had its content changed to Luke Air operated by Blue Panorama Airlines.

On 27 October 2021, the airline announced the suspension of all flights stating financial difficulties in the wake of the COVID-19 pandemic. Blue Panorama went through recurring restructuring proceedings in recent years. Shortly after, it filed for bankruptcy protection. In June 2022, it has been reported that the grounded airline retired both of their Airbus A330-200s leaving them without long-haul capable aircraft.

In December 2022, it has been announced that the airline will be liquidated and not resume operations.

Destinations

Blue Panorama operated a network of Italian domestic destinations branded as blu-express as well as long-haul leisure flights mainly around the Caribbean.

Codeshare agreements
Blue Panorama Airlines maintained Codeshare agreements with the following airlines:

Albawings
Cubana de Aviación

Fleet
As of November 2022, the Blue Panorama fleet no longer included any aircraft. The following types have been operated before:

Accidents and incidents
On 16 July 2004, a Boeing 767-300ER operating as flight 1504 experienced an uncontained engine failure on takeoff from Rome-Fiumucino Airport. The plane returned and conducted a successful emergency landing. Investigation revealed that a high pressure fuel hose leaked approximately 700 kilograms of fuel into the engine's nacelle during taxi, which ignited upon takeoff.

On 22 September 2018, a Blue Panorama Spanish pilot, Emilio Leone, was arrested by Albanian police as his colleagues reported him for trying to fly the aircraft intoxicated.

In popular culture
A Blue Panorama Boeing 757-200 and Boeing 767-300ER appeared in John Legend's music video for "Show Me".

See also
List of defunct airlines of Italy

References

External links

 

Defunct airlines of Italy
Airlines established in 1998
Airlines disestablished in 2022
Italian companies established in 1998
Fiumicino
Italian brands
Companies based in Lazio